Giselle is a 2013 New Zealand drama film written and directed by Toa Fraser. It was screened in the Contemporary World Cinema section at the 2013 Toronto International Film Festival. The film is based on the 2012 production Giselle, performed by The Royal New Zealand Ballet which many of the cast members are part of.

Cast
 Gillian Murphy as Giselle
 Abigail Boyle as Myrtha
 Jacob Chown as Hilarion
 Maclean Hopper as Wilfrid
 Qi Huan as Albrecht

References

External links
 
 Giselle at NZ On Screen

2013 films
2013 drama films
Ballet films
New Zealand drama films
2010s English-language films